The 2019 Wagner Seahawks football team represented Wagner College in the 2019 NCAA Division I FCS football season as a member of the Northeast Conference (NEC). They were led by fifth-year head coach Jason Houghtaling and played their home games at Wagner College Stadium. Wagner finished the season 1–11 overall and 1–6 in NEC play to place seventh. Houghtaling was fired after the season.

Previous season
The Seahawks finished the 2018 season 4–7, 3–3 in NEC play to finish in fourth place.

Preseason

Preseason coaches' poll
The NEC released their preseason coaches' poll on July 24, 2019. The Seahawks were picked to finish in fourth place.

Preseason All-NEC team
The Seahawks had four players at three positions selected to the preseason all-NEC team.

Defense

 Chris Williams– DL
 Cam Gill – LB
 Santoni Graham – LB

Specialists

 Eric Silvester – P

Schedule

Game summaries

at UConn

East Stroudsburg

at Stony Brook

at Florida Atlantic

LIU

Monmouth

Robert Morris

at Duquesne

Central Connecticut

at Sacred Heart

at Saint Francis

Bryant

Ranking movements

References

Wagner
Wagner Seahawks football seasons
Wagner Seahawks football